The District of Keewatin was a territory of Canada and later an administrative district of the Northwest Territories. It was created in 1876 by the Keewatin Act, and originally it covered a large area west of Hudson Bay. In 1905, it became a part of the Northwest Territories and in 1912, its southern parts were adjoined to the provinces of Manitoba and Ontario, leaving the remainder, now called the Keewatin Region, with a population of a few thousand people. On April 1, 1999, the Keewatin Region was formally dissolved, as Nunavut was created from eastern parts of the Northwest Territories, including all of Keewatin.

In Inuktitut, it was called  —a name which persists as the Kivalliq Region in Nunavut.

History as a territory, 1876–1905
The District of Keewatin was created by the passage of the Keewatin Act on October 7, 1876, from a portion of Canada's Northwest Territories. The district ceased being an independent territory in 1905 and was returned to the Northwest Territories. At the time of its abolition, it covered  — roughly the size of Saskatchewan. At its establishment in 1876, it encompassed the bulk of what is now Manitoba and northwestern Ontario and southern Nunavut. Its territory had been reduced over the years as areas were added to the two provinces.

The federal government created the District of Keewatin on the advice of Lieutenant Governor of Manitoba Alexander Morris. Morris convinced the government that the new territorial government of the Northwest Territories would be unable to effectively administer land to the north and east of Manitoba.

Morris was advised of the need for a new territory by James McKay. Morris approved of the idea and began conferring with McKay to determine a proper Indigenous name for the territory. McKay decided upon Keewatin, which comes from the Cree and Saulteaux languages and means 'the land of the north wind'. The government decided to use an Indigenous name to respect the cultural identity of Indigenous peoples, who formed the largest demographic.

District of Keewatin government
The District of Keewatin was run by an appointed council. The legislative branch of the government was a unicameral body, known as the Council of Keewatin. The council contained six members, all of whom were appointed by the lieutenant-governor. Political parties did not exist in the council.

The executive branch of the territory was run by the lieutenant-governor of Manitoba who also doubled as the lieutenant-governor of the District of Keewatin. The seat of government for the district was in Winnipeg, Manitoba.

The District of Keewatin did not have any representation in the House of Commons of Canada or the Senate of Canada.

Prohibition
Upon creation of the District of Keewatin, the Government of Canada decreed that intoxicants such as alcohol were forbidden to be imported into the territory. The government made this decision in regards to active law enforcement to curb the whisky trade running rampant in the Northwest Territories. Laws had been passed two years earlier by the Council of the Northwest Territories to enforce prohibition in that territory.

Law enforcement
The territorial laws created by the Council of Keewatin were enforced by the North-West Mounted Police.

The judicial system in the territory consisted of a combined court system of stipendiary magistrates who were appointed to the Council of the Northwest Territories and court proceedings taking place in the courts of Manitoba.

History, 1905–1999
On September 1, 1905, the District of Keewatin became one of four districts in the Northwest Territories, the other three being the District of Ungava, the District of Mackenzie, and the District of Franklin. Keewatin covered the portion of the Northwest Territories north and east of Manitoba on the mainland (essentially much of present-day mainland Nunavut, northern Manitoba and northwestern Ontario), and western islands in Hudson and James Bays. After the boundaries of Ontario and Manitoba were extended northward in 1912, Keewatin largely consisted of treeless lands in the Arctic.

After 1920, the largely uninhabited eastern islands in Hudson Bay and James Bay that had been part of the District of Ungava were transferred to Keewatin.

Because of the harsh winters and lack of inland roads, settlement of the isolated district by non-indigenous people was poor, and even the Inuit population was sparse. In 1950, there were just 2,400 persons in the entire district.

On April 1, 1999, the Keewatin Region was formally dissolved, as Nunavut was created from eastern parts of the Northwest Territories, including all of Keewatin. However, as an administrative district of the Northwest Territories it had ceased to function several years before it was divided.

See also
Keewatin (disambiguation)

References

Ontario Gen Web: District of Keewatin
 History of Icelandic settlers in the west

Further reading

 Allen, D. Lynne, and Ted H. Hogg. Bird studies in the Keewatin District. ESCOM report, no AI-27. Ottawa: Environmental-Social Program, Northern Pipelines, 1979.
 Aspler, Lawrence B. Analysis of Gossans and Exploration Guides, Hawk Hill-Griffin-Mountain Lakes Area, District of Keewatin. Yellowknife, N.W.T.: Indian and Northern Affairs Canada, 1990.
 Gordon, T. M. Precambrian Geology of the Daly Bay Area, District of Keewatin. [Ottawa, Ontario, Canada]: Energy, Mines and Resources Canada, 1988. 
 Harrington, Richard, and Edmund Snow Carpenter. Padlei Diary, 1950 An Account of the Padleimiut Eskimo in the Keewatin District West of Hudson Bay During the Early Months of 1950. [S.l.]: Rock Foundation, 2000.
 Heard, Douglas C., George W. Calef, and Steve Cooper. Numbers, Distribution, and Productivity of Caribou in Northeastern Keewatin District, Northwest Territories. Yellowknife: N.W.T. Fish and Wildlife Service, 1977.
 Heywood, W. W., and B. V. Sanford. Geology of Southampton, Coats, and Mansel Islands, District of Keewatin, Northwest Territories. Ottawa, Ontario, Canada: Geological Survey of Canada, 1976. 
 Hillis, Tracy L. The Demography and Ecology of the Tundra Wolf, Canis lupus, in the Keewatin District, Northwest Territories. Thesis (M.Sc.)--Laurentian University, 1990, 1990. 
 Kuo, Chun-Yan. A Study of Income and Income Distribution in the Keewatin District of Northern Canada. [Ottawa]: Regional Planning Section, Policy and Planning ACND Division, Northern Policy and Program Planning Branch, Dept. of Indian Affairs and Northern Development, 1974.
 Lee, Hulbert Austin. Surficial Geology of Southern District of Keewatin And the Keewatin Ice Divide, Northwest Territories. Ottawa: Queen's printer, 1959.
 Norris, A. W. Brachiopods from the Lower Shale Member of the Williams Island Formation (Middle Devonian) of the Hudson Platform, Northern Ontario and Southern District of Keewatin. Ottawa: Geological Survey of Canada, 1993. 
 Schau, Mikkel. Geology of the Prince Albert Group in Parts of Walker Lake and Laughland Lake Map Areas, District of Keewatin. [Ottawa]: Geological Survey of Canada, 1982. 
 Steenhoven, G. van den. Leadership and Law Among the Eskimos of the Keewatin District, Northwest Territories. Rijswijk: Excelsior, 1962.
 Stewart, D. B., and Lionel M. J. Bernier. An Aquatic Resource Survey of Victoria and King William Islands and the Northeastern District of Keewatin, Northwest Territories. [Ottawa]: Supply and Services Canada, 1983. 
 Taylor, Frederick C. Precambrian Geology of the Half Way Hills Area, District of Keewatin. Ottawa, Ontario, Canada: Geological Survey of Canada, 1985. 
 Wright, J. V. The Grant Lake Site, Keewatin District, N.W.T. Ottawa: National Museums of Canada, 1976.
 Wright, J. V. The Aberdeen Site, Keewatin District, N.W.T. Mercury series. Ottawa: Archaeological Survey of Canada, National Museum of Man, National Museums of Canada, 1972.
 Zoltai, S. C., and J. D. Johnson. Vegetation-Soil Relationships in the Keewatin District. Ottawa: Environmental-Social Program, Northern Pipelines, 1978.

 
Districts of the Northwest Territories
1876 establishments in Canada